The 2021–22 season is Fortuna Düsseldorf's 127th season in existence and the club's second season back in the 2. Bundesliga, the second tier of German football, following their relegation from the Bundesliga in the 2019–20 season. The club will also participate in the DFB-Pokal.

Background and pre-season

Fortuna Düsseldorf finished the 2020–21 season in 5th place, 8 points below the automatic promotion places and 6 points below the promotion play-off place. Manager Uwe Rösler's contract was not renewed at the end of the previous season. Christian Preußer was appointed as manager in May 2021.

Pre-season

Competitions

2. Bundesliga

League table

Matches

DFB-Pokal

Transfers

Transfers in

Loans in

Transfers out

Loans out

Notes

References

Düsseldorf
Fortuna Düsseldorf seasons